This is a partial list of species in the genus Strumigenys, miniature trap-jaw ants. AntCat lists more than 850 species in total.

Strumigenys species

 Strumigenys actis  g
 Strumigenys adrasora Bolton, 1983 i c g
 Strumigenys adsita  g
 Strumigenys aenigma Bolton, 2000 g
 Strumigenys alperti  g
 Strumigenys anetes Brown, 1988 i c g
 Strumigenys anthocera Lattke & Goitia, 1997 i c g
 Strumigenys arizonica  b
 Strumigenys arnoldi Forel, 1913 i c g
 Strumigenys auctidens (Bolton, 2000) g
 Strumigenys balux  g
 Strumigenys bathron  g
 Strumigenys beebei (Wheeler, 1915) g
 Strumigenys bequaerti  g
 Strumigenys bernardi Brown, 1960 i c g
 Strumigenys biconvexa  g
 Strumigenys biolleyi Forel, 1908 i c g
 Strumigenys biroi Emery, 1897 i c g
 Strumigenys bitheria Bolton, 1983 i c g
 Strumigenys boneti Brown, 1959 i c g
 Strumigenys borgmeieri Brown, 1954 i c g
 Strumigenys bryanti Wheeler, 1919 i c g
 Strumigenys buleru Brown, 1988 i c g
 Strumigenys cacaoensis Bolton, 1971 i c g
 Strumigenys calypso  g
 Strumigenys carinithorax Borgmeier, 1934 i c g
 Strumigenys carisa  g
 Strumigenys chapmani Brown, 1954 i c g
 Strumigenys chareta Bolton, 2000 g
 Strumigenys chernovi Dlussky, 1993 i c g
 Strumigenys chiricahua (Ward, 1988) b
 Strumigenys chuchihensis Lin & Wu, 2001 g
 Strumigenys chyzeri Emery, 1897 i c g
 Strumigenys clypeata  b
 Strumigenys cochlearis Brown, 1988 i c g
 Strumigenys consanii Brown, 1954 i c g
 Strumigenys cordovensis Mayr, 1887 i c g
 Strumigenys cosmostela Kempf, 1975 i c g
 Strumigenys covina  g
 Strumigenys cultrigera Mayr, 1887 i c g
 Strumigenys decollata Mann, 1919 i c g
 Strumigenys deinomastax (Bolton, 2000) g
 Strumigenys deltisquama Brown, 1957 i c g
 Strumigenys dextra Brown, 1954 i c g
 Strumigenys diabola Bolton, 2000 g
 Strumigenys dicomas Fisher, 2000 g
 Strumigenys diota  g
 Strumigenys disarmata Brown, 1971 i c g
 Strumigenys dolabra  g
 Strumigenys dolichognatha Weber, 1934 i c g
 Strumigenys dora  g
 Strumigenys doriae Emery, 1887 i c g
 Strumigenys doxa  g
 Strumigenys dromoshaula Bolton, 1983 i c g
 Strumigenys dyak Brown, 1959 i c g
 Strumigenys dyschima Bolton, 2000 g
 Strumigenys dyseides Bolton, 2000 g
 Strumigenys dyshaula Bolton, 1983 i c g
 Strumigenys ebbae Forel, 1905 i c g
 Strumigenys ecliptacoca Brown, 1958 i c g
 Strumigenys ection  g
 Strumigenys eggersi  b
 Strumigenys elongata Roger, 1863 i c g
 Strumigenys emdeni Forel, 1915 i c g
 Strumigenys emeryi Mann, 1922 i c g
 Strumigenys enopla (Bolton, 2000) g
 Strumigenys epelys  g
 Strumigenys esrossi Brown, 1957 i c g
 Strumigenys ettillax Bolton, 1983 i c g
 Strumigenys fairchildi Brown, 1961 i c g
 Strumigenys fanano  g
 Strumigenys faurei Arnold, 1948 i c g
 Strumigenys feae Emery, 1895 i c g
 Strumigenys ferocior Brown, 1973 i c g
 Strumigenys forficata Brown, 1959 i c g
 Strumigenys formosensis Forel, 1912 i c g
 Strumigenys friedae Forel, 1915 i c g
 Strumigenys frivaldszkyi Emery, 1897 i c g
 Strumigenys glanduscula  g
 Strumigenys glenognatha (Bolton, 2000) g
 Strumigenys godeffroyi Mayr, 1866 i c g
 Strumigenys godmani Forel, 1899 i c g
 Strumigenys gorgon  g
 Strumigenys grandidieri Forel, 1892 i c g
 Strumigenys guttulata Forel, 1902 i c g
 Strumigenys hadrodens (Bolton, 2000) g
 Strumigenys hastyla Bolton, 1983 i c g
 Strumigenys havilandi Forel, 1905 i c g
 Strumigenys helytruga Bolton, 1983 i c g
 Strumigenys hemichlaena Brown, 1971 i c g
 Strumigenys hemidisca Brown, 1953 i c g
 Strumigenys hindenburgi Forel, 1915 i c g
 Strumigenys hispida Lin & Wu, 1996 g
 Strumigenys hoplites Brown, 1973 i c g
 Strumigenys horvathi Emery, 1897 i c g
 Strumigenys humata Lattke & Goitia, 1997 i c g
 Strumigenys indagatrix Wheeler, 1919 i c g
 Strumigenys insolita  g
 Strumigenys insula (Bolton, 2000) g
 Strumigenys interfectiva Lattke & Goitia, 1997 i c g
 Strumigenys irrorata Santschi, 1913 i c g
 Strumigenys jepsoni Mann, 1921 i c g
 Strumigenys juliae Forel, 1905 i c g
 Strumigenys katapelta Bolton, 1983 i c g
 Strumigenys koningsbergeri Forel, 1905 i c g
 Strumigenys konteiensis Lin & Wu, 2001 g
 Strumigenys korahyla Bolton, 1983 i c g
 Strumigenys kraepelini Forel, 1905 i c g
 Strumigenys lacacoca Brown, 1959 i c g
 Strumigenys lacunosa Lin & Wu, 1996 g
 Strumigenys lamia Bolton, 2000 g
 Strumigenys langrandi  g
 Strumigenys lanuginosa Wheeler, 1905 i c g
 Strumigenys lewisi Cameron, 1886 i c g
 Strumigenys lichiaensis Lin & Wu, 1996
 Strumigenys liukueiensis Terayama & Kubota, 1989 i c g
 Strumigenys londianensis (Patrizi, 1946) i c g
 Strumigenys longispinosa Brown, 1958 i c g
 Strumigenys lopotyle Brown, 1969 i c g
 Strumigenys loriae Emery, 1897 i c g
 Strumigenys louisianae Roger, 1863 i c g b
 Strumigenys luca  g
 Strumigenys ludia Mann, 1922 i c g
 Strumigenys lutron  g
 Strumigenys lyroessa (Roger, 1862) i c g
 Strumigenys mailei Wilson & Taylor, 1967 i c g
 Strumigenys mandibularis Smith, 1860 i c g
 Strumigenys manga  g
 Strumigenys margarita  g
 Strumigenys marginiventris Santschi, 1931 i c g
 Strumigenys marleyi Arnold, 1914 i c g
 Strumigenys maxillaris Baroni Urbani, 2007 g
 Strumigenys maynei  g
 Strumigenys mayri Emery, 1897 i c g
 Strumigenys membranifera Emery, 1869 b
 Strumigenys mesahyla Bolton, 1983 i c g
 Strumigenys micrans  g
 Strumigenys micretes Brown, 1959 i c g
 Strumigenys minutula Terayama & Kubota, 1989 i c g
 Strumigenys mionova Bolton, 2000 g
 Strumigenys mitis Brown, 2000 g
 Strumigenys mixta Brown, 1953 i c g
 Strumigenys mjoebergi Brown, 1959 i c g
 Strumigenys mocsaryi Emery, 1897 i c g
 Strumigenys mumfordi Wheeler, 1932 g
 Strumigenys murshila Bolton, 1983 i c g
 Strumigenys nanzanensis Lin & Wu, 1996
 Strumigenys nevermanni Brown, 1959 i c g
 Strumigenys nidifex Mann, 1921 i c g
 Strumigenys nigra Brown, 1971 i c g
 Strumigenys nimbrata Bolton, 1983 i c g
 Strumigenys ogloblini Santschi, 1936 i c g
 Strumigenys omalyx Bolton, 1983 i c g
 Strumigenys opaca Brown, 1954 i c g
 Strumigenys orchidensis Lin & Wu, 2001 g
 Strumigenys ornata  b
 Strumigenys pallestes Bolton, 1971 i c g
 Strumigenys paranax Bolton, 1983 i c g
 Strumigenys paranetes Brown, 1988 i c g
 Strumigenys pariensis Lattke & Goitia, 1997 i c g
 Strumigenys pergandei  b
 Strumigenys perparva Brown, 1958 i c g
 Strumigenys perplexa (Smith, 1876) i c g
 Strumigenys petiolata Bernard, 1953 i c g
 Strumigenys peyrierasi  g
 Strumigenys philiporum Brown, 1988 i c g
 Strumigenys phytibia Brown, 1957 i c g
 Strumigenys pilinasis  b
 Strumigenys planeti Brown, 1953 i c g
 Strumigenys precava Brown, 1954 i c g
 Strumigenys pretoriae Arnold, 1949 i c g
 Strumigenys princeps Kempf & Brown, 1969 i c g
 Strumigenys prospiciens Emery, 1906 i c g
 Strumigenys quinquedentata Crawley, 1923 i c g
 Strumigenys rallarhina Bolton, 2000 g
 Strumigenys ravola  g
 Strumigenys raymondi  g
 Strumigenys rectidens Brown, 1966 i c g
 Strumigenys rehi Forel, 1907 i c g
 Strumigenys relahyla Bolton, 1983 i c g
 Strumigenys rogeri Emery, 1890 i c g
 Strumigenys rostrata  b
 Strumigenys rubigus  g
 Strumigenys rufobrunea Santschi, 1914 i c g
 Strumigenys rukha Bolton, 1983 i c g
 Strumigenys saliens Mayr, 1887 i c g
 Strumigenys sanctipauli Kempf, 1958 i c g
 Strumigenys sarissa Bolton, 1983 i c g
 Strumigenys sauteri Forel, 1912 g
 Strumigenys scelesta Mann, 1921 i c g
 Strumigenys schmalzi Emery, 1906 i c g
 Strumigenys scotti Forel, 1912 i c g
 Strumigenys shaula Bolton, 1983 i c g
 Strumigenys signeae Forel, 1905 i c g
 Strumigenys silvestrii Emery, 1906 i c g
 Strumigenys simoni  g
 Strumigenys sisyrata Brown, 1968 i c g
 Strumigenys smithii Forel, 1886 i c g
 Strumigenys smythiesii Forel, 1902 i c g
 Strumigenys solifontis Brown, 1949 i c g
 Strumigenys spathoda Bolton, 1983 i c g
 Strumigenys spathula Lattke & Goitia, 1997 i c g
 Strumigenys stemonixys Brown, 1971 i c g
 Strumigenys stygia Santschi, 1913 i c g
 Strumigenys sublaminata Brown, 1959 i c g
 Strumigenys sublonga Brown, 1958 i c g
 Strumigenys sulfurea  g
 Strumigenys szalayi Emery, 1897 i c g
 Strumigenys tachirensis Lattke & Goitia, 1997 i c g
 Strumigenys tegar  g
 Strumigenys tenuipilis Emery, 1915 n
 Strumigenys tetraphanes Brown, 1954 i c g
 Strumigenys thomae Kempf, 1976 i c g
 Strumigenys tigris Brown, 1971 i c g
 Strumigenys tococae Wheeler & Bequaert, 1929 i c g
 Strumigenys toma  g
 Strumigenys totyla Bolton, 1983 i c g
 Strumigenys trada Lin & Wu, 1996 g
 Strumigenys traegaordhi Santschi, 1913 i c g
 Strumigenys trinidadensis Wheeler, 1922 i c g
 Strumigenys trudifera Kempf & Brown, 1969 i c g
 Strumigenys tumida Bolton, 2000
 Strumigenys uichancoi Brown, 1957 i c g
 Strumigenys ulcerosa Brown, 1954 i c g
 Strumigenys usbensis Lattke & Goitia, 1997 i c g
 Strumigenys vazerka Bolton, 1983 i c g
 Strumigenys wallacei Emery, 1897 i c g
 Strumigenys wardi  g
 Strumigenys wilsoni Brown, 1969 i c g
 Strumigenys xenohyla Bolton, 1983 i c g
 Strumigenys xenos Brown, 1955 i c g
 Strumigenys yaleopleura Brown, 1988 i c g
 Strumigenys yasumatsui Brown, 1971 i c g
 Strumigenys zakharovi Dlussky, 1993 i c g
 Strumigenys zandala Bolton, 1983 i c g

Data sources: i = ITIS, c = Catalogue of Life, g = GBIF, b = Bugguide.net, n = Barry Bolton's New General Catalogue

References

Strumigenys